Eric Knodel (born June 8, 1990) is an American professional ice hockey player who most recently played for the Lehigh Valley Phantoms of the American Hockey League (AHL). He was drafted by the Toronto Maple Leafs in the fifth round (128th overall) of the 2009 NHL Entry Draft.

Career statistics

Awards and honors

References

External links

1990 births
Living people
American ice hockey defensemen
Cincinnati Cyclones (ECHL) players
Des Moines Buccaneers players
Ice hockey players from Pennsylvania
Lehigh Valley Phantoms players
New Hampshire Wildcats men's ice hockey players
Orlando Solar Bears (ECHL) players
People from West Chester, Pennsylvania
Reading Royals players
Rochester Americans players
San Diego Gulls (AHL) players
Toronto Maple Leafs draft picks
Toronto Marlies players
Utah Grizzlies (ECHL) players